George Benjamin Harrison (14 September 1895–date of death unknown) was an English cricketer. Harrison was a left-handed batsman. He was born at Dalton, near Skelmersdale, Lancashire.

Harrison made his first-class debut for Glamorgan in 1924 against Gloucestershire.  From 1924 to 1925, he represented the county in 9 first-class matches, with his final appearance coming against Northamptonshire.  In his 9 first-class matches he scored 109 runs at a batting average of 6.41, with a high score of 34.  In the field he took 3 catches.

References

External links
George Harrison at Cricinfo
George Harrison at CricketArchive

1895 births
People from Skelmersdale
English cricketers
Glamorgan cricketers
Year of death missing